Charleston may refer to the following places in the U.S. state of Michigan:

 Charleston Township, Michigan in Kalamazoo County
 Charleston, Sanilac County, Michigan, a historical settlement in Delaware Township
 Charleston, Cass County, Michigan, a historical settlement in Volinia Township